Studio City is a neighborhood in the city of Los Angeles, California, in the southeast San Fernando Valley, just west of the Cahuenga Pass. It is named after the studio lot that was established in the area by film producer Mack Sennett in 1927, now known as Radford Studio Center.

History

Originally known as Laurelwood, the area that Studio City occupies was formerly part of Rancho Ex-Mission San Fernando. Rancho Ex-Mission San Fernando was a  Mexican land grant in present-day Los Angeles County, California, granted in 1846 by Governor Pío Pico to Eulogio F. de Celis. This land changed hands several times during the late 19th century, and was eventually owned by James Boon Lankershim (1850–1931), and eight other developers, who organized the Lankershim Ranch Land and Water Company. In 1899, however, the area lost most water rights to Los Angeles, so subdivision and sale of land for farming became untenable.

Construction of the Los Angeles Aqueduct began in 1908, and water reached the San Fernando Valley in November, 1913. Real estate boomed, and a syndicate led by Harry Chandler, business manager of the Los Angeles Times, with Hobart Johnstone Whitley, Isaac Van Nuys, and James Boon Lankershim acquired the remaining  of the southern half of the former Mission lands—everything west of the Lankershim town limits and south of present-day Roscoe Boulevard excepting the Rancho Encino. Whitley platted the area of present-day Studio City from portions of the existing town of Lankershim, as well as the eastern part of the new acquisition.

In 1927, Mack Sennett began building a new studio on  donated by the land developer. The area around the studio was named Studio City.

In 1955, Studio City's Station 78 became the first racially integrated station in the Los Angeles City Fire Department.

Geography
The Los Angeles River and Tujunga Wash flow through Studio City. The two concrete-lined channels merge just west of Colfax Avenue and north of Ventura Boulevard adjacent to Radford Studio Center.

Demographics
The 2000 U.S. census counted 34,034 residents in the  Studio City neighborhood—5,395 people per square mile, among the lowest population densities for the city but about average for the county. In 2008, the city estimated that the resident population had increased to 37,201.

In 2000, the median age for residents, 38, was considered old for city and county neighborhoods; the percent of residents age 19 and older was among the county's highest.

The ethnic breakdown was Whites, 78%; Latinos, 8.7%; Asians, 5.4%; Blacks, 3.7%; and others, 4.1%. Iran (7%) and the United Kingdom (6.7%) were the most common places of birth for the 21.1% of the residents who were born abroad—a low percentage for Los Angeles.

The median yearly household income in 2008 dollars was $75,657, considered high for the city. The percent of households earning $125,000 and up was high for Los Angeles County. The average household size of 1.9 people was low when compared to the rest of the city and the county. Renters occupied 55.9% of the housing stock and house- or apartment-owners held 44.1%.

In 2000, there were 837 families headed by single parents, the rate of 11.2% being low for the city of Los Angeles. There were 2,591 veterans, 8.8% of the population, a high figure for the city.

Arts and culture

Notable places
 Radford Studio Center (formerly known as CBS Studio Center)
 Los Angeles River walk (see North Valleyheart Riverwalk 
 Exterior of Brady Bunch house 
Campo de Cahuenga
 Metro Red Line Universal City/Studio City station
 Several buildings by Rudolph Michael Schindler

Library
 The Studio City branch of the Los Angeles Public Library is at the corner of Moorpark Street and Whitsett Avenue.

Parks and recreation
The Studio City Recreation Center (commonly known as Beeman Park) is in a residential neighborhood on Rye Street at Beeman Avenue. It has an auditorium, barbecue pits, a lighted baseball diamond, an outdoor running and walking track, lighted outdoor basketball courts, a children's play area, picnic tables, unlighted tennis courts, and many programs and classes including the second-largest youth baseball program in the public parks.

Moorpark Park, an unstaffed pocket park at the corner of Moorpark Street and Laurel Canyon Boulevard, has a children's play area and picnic tables.

Woodbridge Park, on Elmer Avenue at Moorpark Street, on the eastern border of Studio City has a children and toddler's play area.

Wilacre Park, a 128-acre natural mountain park with the lower trailhead for the Betty B Dearing hiking trail, is on Fryman Road at Laurel Canyon Boulevard. It has a large parking lot, restrooms and a picnic area. It is part of the Santa Monica Mountains Conservancy and is managed by the Mountains Recreation & Conservation Authority.

Fryman Canyon Park is a 122-acre nature park accessed via the Nancy Hoover Pohl Overlook on Mulholland Drive with the upper trailhead of the Betty B Dearing hiking trail. The park is part of the Santa Monica Mountains Conservancy and is managed by the Mountains Recreation & Conservation Authority.

Coldwater Canyon Park is a nature park adjacent to Wilacre Park and Fryman Canyon Park. It contains an amphitheater and the headquarters for the conservation group TreePeople. It can be accessed via a parking lot near the corner of Mulholland Drive and Coldwater Canyon Avenue and via the Betty B Dearing Trail. The park is managed by the City of Los Angeles Department of Recreation and Parks (LA Parks). This park is not to be confused with an unrelated park with the name Coldwater Canyon Park, three miles to the south on North Beverly Drive in the city of Beverly Hills.

In addition, Studio City has the Studio City Mini-Park, an unstaffed pocket park.

North Valleyheart Riverwalk is a linear park that abuts the Los Angeles River.

Government
The northeast part of Studio City is in City Council District 2, represented by Paul Krekorian, and the southwest section is in District 4, represented by Nithya Raman. The community is represented within the city of Los Angeles by the Studio City Neighborhood Council.

The area is represented by Los Angeles County District 3 Supervisor Sheila Kuehl, State Senator Robert Hertzberg, California Assemblyman Adrin Nazarian and U.S. Representative Brad Sherman.

Education

Almost half of Studio City residents aged 25 and older (49.4%) had earned a four-year degree by 2000, a high percentage for both the city and the county. The percentage of those residents with a master's degree was also high for the county.

Schools

Schools within the Studio City boundaries are:

 Bridges Academy, private, 4-12, 3921 Laurel Canyon Boulevard
 Campbell Hall School, private, K-12, 4533 Laurel Canyon Boulevard
 Carpenter Community Charter School, LAUSD, K-5, 3909 Carpenter Avenue
 Harvard-Westlake School, private, 10-12, 3700 Coldwater Canyon Avenue
 Walter Reed Middle School, LAUSD, 6-8, 4525 Irvine Avenue
 Oakwood School, private, K-6, 11230 Moorpark Street
 Rio Vista Elementary School, LAUSD, K-5, 4243 Satsuma Avenue
 St. Charles Borromeo School, private, K-8, 10850 Moorpark Street

Notable people

Film and television

 Leon Ames, film and television actor
 Ernie Anderson, television and radio announcer/voiceover artist
 Paul Thomas Anderson, film director
 Dana Andrews, film actor and past president of the Screen Actors' Guild
R. G. Armstrong, actor and playwright
 Ed Asner, film, television, stage, and voice actor, past president of the SAG
 Gene Autry, actor, singer-songwriter, businessman and owner of the California Angels baseball team
 Joe Barbera, animator, director and co-founder of Hanna-Barbera studios
 Bonnie Bartlett, television and film actress
 Ed Begley Jr., actor and environmentalist
 Joseph Benti, television news anchor
 Mayim Bialik, film and television actress 
 Robert Blake, actor
 Julie Bowen, actress
 Clancy Brown, actor
 Smiley Burnette, comedic actor, singer-songwriter and inventor
 George Clooney, actor, film director, producer, and screenwriter
 Gary Cole, actor
 Marisa Coughlan, actress
 Barry Crane, television producer and director
 Jon Cryer, actor
 William Daniels, actor and former president of the Screen Actors Guild
 Brad Davis, actor
 Jimmy Dore, comedian and political commentator
 Yvonne De Carlo, actress of film, television, and theater
 Zooey Deschanel, actress
 Leonardo DiCaprio, actor and producer
 Charles S. Dutton, stage, film, and television actor and director
 Zac Efron, actor
 Erik Estrada, actor
 Clark Gable, actor
 Betty Garrett, actress, singer and dancer
 Jennie Garth, actress
 Vince Gironda, movie star trainer and bodybuilder
 Meagan Good, actress, film producer
 Cuba Gooding Jr., actor
 Ryan Gosling, actor
 Gary Graver, film director and cinematographer
 Tom Green, actor, comedian
 Earl Holliman, Golden Globe winning film and television actor.
 Lucy Hale, actress and singer
 Neil Patrick Harris, actor, singer, writer and magician
 Laurel Holloman, actress
 Vanessa Hudgens, actress and singer
 Allison Janney, actress
 Mila Kunis, actress
 Tom Kenny, voice actor, voice director, comedian
 Lucy Lawless, actress
 Lucy Liu, actress
 Seth MacFarlane, actor, singer, comedian and producer
 Jennette McCurdy, actress
 Roddy McDowall, actor and photographer
 Kevin McKidd, film and television actor
 Alyssa Milano, actress
 Dennis Miller, TV host and comedian
 Chloë Grace Moretz, actress
 Bill Nye, science educator, comedian, television host, actor, and mechanical engineer
 Jack Osbourne, reality show star
 Patton Oswalt, actor and comedian
 Jason Priestley, television actor 
 Michael Richards, actor, comedian, writer and television producer
 Alex Rocco, actor
 Aaron Seltzer, director and screenwriter
 William Shatner, actor, musician, recording artist, and author
 Melville Shavelson, film director, producer, screenwriter, and author
 Mason Shefa, director of experimental films
 Anna Nicole Smith, model, actress and television personality 
 Sage Stallone, actor and producer
 Jonathan Stark, actor, writer, producer
 Linda Stirling, actress, showgirl, model and college professor
 Lyle Talbot, film, TV and stage actor; a founder of the Screen Actors Guild (SAG); honorary mayor of Studio City in the 1960s
 Stephen Talbot, child actor; PBS Frontline documentary producer
 Alex Trebek, game show host
 Renee Valente, producer, former president of the Producers Guild of America
 Sofía Vergara, actress 
 Nancy Walker, actress, comedian and director
 Anton Yelchin, actor

Music

Literature
 Elizabeth Forsythe Hailey, journalist and playwright
 Lorin Morgan-Richards, author and illustrator
 Jerry Pournelle, science-fiction author and blogger
 Israel Regardie, occultist

Sports
 Zack Greinke, Major League Baseball pitcher
 Clayton Kershaw, Major League Baseball pitcher
 Joc Pederson, Major League Baseball outfielder
 Justin Turner, Major League Baseball player
Jrue Holiday, National Basketball Association player

Other
 David Burtka, chef and actor
 Peter Hurkos, allegedly manifested extra-sensory perception
 James B. Potter Jr., Los Angeles City Council member
 Jerome Vered, record-setting contestant on the game show Jeopardy! 
 Joel Wachs, Los Angeles City Council member
 Sam Yorty,  mayor of Los Angeles

References

External links

 Studio City Neighborhood Council
 Studio City Residents Association
 Studio City Chamber of Commerce

 
Neighborhoods in Los Angeles
Communities in the San Fernando Valley
Populated places in the Santa Monica Mountains